...Calling All Stations... is the fifteenth and final studio album by English rock band Genesis. It was released 1 September 1997 by Virgin Records, and is their only album featuring Scottish singer Ray Wilson as frontman following the departure of longtime drummer/singer Phil Collins in 1996. The remaining members—founding keyboardist Tony Banks and guitarist/bassist Mike Rutherford—decided to continue the band and write new music for an album, during which they auditioned singers and picked Wilson.

Calling All Stations was released to mostly negative reviews from music critics who chastised its lack of direction, but praised Wilson's performance. It sold poorly in comparison to their earlier albums; it reached No. 2 in the UK and performed well in Europe, but it peaked at No. 54 in the US. This marked their first studio album not to reach number one in the UK since 1978. "Congo", the first of three singles from the album, went to No. 29 in the UK. The Calling All Stations Tour saw Genesis tour Europe throughout 1998, but an American leg was booked and cancelled twice due to low ticket sales. The group disbanded at the tour's conclusion, focusing on archival and greatest hit albums until Collins returned in 2006 for the Turn It On Again Tour.

Background

At the end of the We Can't Dance Tour in November 1992 the band went on hiatus, reuniting only for a one-off charity performance in September 1993. Their drummer and lead vocalist Phil Collins resumed his solo career and released Both Sides, keyboardist Tony Banks recorded an album with Jack Hues under the Strictly Inc. project, and guitarist/bassist Mike Rutherford continued his band Mike + the Mechanics. In mid-1994, Collins said that singing Genesis songs at the charity gig after making Both Sides, which he deemed a highly personal album, was uncomfortable. "For the first time I felt like an actor playing somebody else's part." After a band meeting with manager Tony Smith in the summer of 1995, Collins left. A press release from management announcing the news was released in March 1996.

Banks and Rutherford decided they had nothing to lose and started to write new songs in January 1996 to see if it was worth carrying on with Genesis. After some ideas had been put down they were pleased with the results and began to audition lead singers. At this stage, the basic structure of the tracks on Calling All Stations had been written but the lyrics had not been worked on. Shortly after the album's release, Wilson described the material as a mixture of their earlier progressive rock sound and their later, more commercial period.

The final two candidates were English singer David Longdon, later a member of Big Big Train, and Scottish singer and guitarist Ray Wilson of the grunge-influenced band Stiltskin. Longdon's song "Hieroglyphics of Love" attracted producer Nick Davis who forwarded it onto Banks and Rutherford and liked it enough to invite him to the studio to audition. Banks had liked Wilson's vocals from listening to Stiltskin's first album, The Mind's Eye (1994). For his first audition, Wilson sang Genesis songs with Collins's vocals removed. At his second, he was asked to contribute vocal ideas to the new music that Banks and Rutherford had written, singing and humming ideas on the spot. Takes from this session were used by Banks to shape the verses to "There Must Be Some Other Way". In November 1996, Banks and Rutherford chose Wilson as the new lead singer. Longdon said Rutherford phoned him with the news while Banks sent him a Christmas card with "a lengthy message inside." Wilson's arrival into the band was made public on 6 June 1997.

Recording
Calling All Stations features Israeli session drummer Nir Zidkyahu and American drummer Nick D'Virgilio of the prog rock band Spock's Beard. It was recorded using RADAR, a type of non-linear digital audio recording software capable of simultaneously recording 24-tracks onto computer hard drives.

Wilson said he had a "pretty small" amount of input into the album. Wilson recalled having free rein with his vocals on Rutherford's songs because he "doesn't know what he wants until he hears it", whereas Banks had worked out firm ideas from the beginning.

Songs
"Calling All Stations" is the first track Banks and Rutherford wrote for the album and most of the original takes were retained for the recorded version. It was used as the opener because of its heavier rock sound and dramatic mood. The song's arrangement underwent several changes as Banks and Rutherford had Wilson sing various melody lines to see what his voice was capable of, resulting in a stronger track overall. Wilson picked "Calling All Stations" as his favourite song from the album.

The lyrics to "Small Talk" were written by Wilson. The B-side "Anything Now" was considered one of the strongest tracks from the recording sessions but was not included on the album, as Banks believed "we couldn't quite get Ray to sing it right."

Release
The album was launched in Europe on 26 August 1997 with a live press conference, interview, and acoustic performance on German television and VH1 from the Television Tower in Berlin. Two days later, the North American launch event with a live interview and acoustic performance took place at the Kennedy Space Center in Florida, broadcast as a nationwide radio special.

Calling All Stations peaked at No. 2 in the UK, making it the first Genesis studio album not to reach the top spot since ...And Then There Were Three... (1978). It was also their first album not to produce a Top 20 single in the UK since Wind & Wuthering (1976). It failed to make an impact in the US chart with a peak at No. 54 on the Billboard 200. This made Calling All Stations the first Genesis album since Selling England by the Pound (1973) to not crack its top 50. It also became their first album since A Trick of the Tail (1976) to not produce a charting single in the US.

A Super Audio CD/DVD set with new stereo and 5.1 surround sound mixes was released in September 2007. A CD/DVD set was released in North America in November 2007.

Reception

Steve Knopper reviewed the album in the Chicago Tribune, calling it "a formless blob of synth sounds" and asserting that new singer Ray Wilson has "no confidence or personality, let alone the vision to stave off his bandmates' meandering ideas." Both AllMusic and Rolling Stone commented that Ray Wilson was a fitting vocal replacement for Collins, but thought that the album was generally lacking in good material. AllMusic picked "Calling All Stations", "Congo", and "Not About Us" as the album's stronger tracks, while Rolling Stone described "Shipwrecked" and "Not About Us" as "pleasant if generic FM-rock tunes." Both also commented on the album's odd mix of art rock and pop, believing that it failed to gel into 
a coherent style; Rolling Stone summarised it as "a Mike and the Mechanics artrock album". In 2014, Stevie Chick of The Guardian dismissed the album as "inexplicable".

In a 2019 interview, Tony Banks thought the album contained "some very good songs," but "has a kind of uniformity about it that I regret. It contains one or two rather weak tracks, too. We also left off two of the strongest tracks, which was a mistake." Rutherford said he did not regret making Calling All Stations, but due to its sales being lower than that of previous Genesis albums, he had "sensed that the mood had changed in terms of radio play." As he thought Genesis was already "becoming a catalogue act," this influenced the band's decision to stop recording new material.

Tour and aftermath
Genesis supported the album with a 47-date European tour from 29 January to 31 May 1998, featuring shows in large arenas throughout Europe. The core trio were joined by Zidkyahu on drums, percussion, and backing vocals and Irish musician Anthony Drennan on guitar and bass. Former touring members Daryl Stuermer and Chester Thompson were initially approached but Stuermer was already working with Collins and Thompson refused to join after his request for full-fledged band membership was denied. Rehearsals took place at Bray Film Studios in Windsor and the Working Men's Club in Chiddingfold, close to the band's recording studio. The tour concluded with spots at the Rock am Ring and Rock im Park Festival in Germany. A majority of the older songs were transposed in a lower key to accommodate Wilson's lower vocal range. Midway through the set included an acoustic medley of songs from their 1970s output. The tour was captured live on the promotional album Calling Radio Stations. 

A 27-date North American tour in large arenas was booked to start in November 1997, but it was cancelled due to insufficient ticket sales. A revised 22-date tour in smaller venues was arranged, but that too was cancelled. At the European tour's conclusion, Genesis went on hiatus until Collins returned for their 2007 Turn It On Again Tour.

Track listing
All songs written by Tony Banks and Mike Rutherford, except where noted.

Note: The CD liner notes state that track 7, "The Dividing Line", is 8:59.

B-sides
"Papa He Said" and "Banjo Man" are from the single "Congo". "Phret" and "7/8" (which are both instrumentals) are from the single "Shipwrecked". "Anything Now", "Sign Your Life Away" and "Run Out of Time" are from the single "Not About Us". All these tracks are Banks/Rutherford compositions, except "Banjo Man" which is by Banks/Rutherford/Wilson.  "Nowhere Else to Turn" is an unreleased track from the sessions that only appeared on a promotional CD.

Personnel 
Credits adapted from the album's liner notes.

Genesis
 Tony Banks – keyboards, acoustic guitar, backing vocals
 Mike Rutherford – guitars, bass, backing vocals
 Ray Wilson – lead vocals

Additional musicians
 Nick D'Virgilio – drums on "Alien Afternoon" (first half), "If That's What You Need", "Uncertain Weather", and "Small Talk", percussion
 Nir Zidkyahu – drums on "Alien Afternoon" (second half) and everything else, percussion

Production
 Tony Banks – producer
 Mike Rutherford – producer
 Nick Davis – producer, engineer
 Ian Huffam – assistant engineer
 Recorded at The Farm, Surrey, England 
 Geoff Callingham – technical assistance
 Mike Bowen – technical assistance
 Dale Newman – general assistance
 Wherefore ART? – sleeve design
 Kevin Westernberg – photography
 Peter Robathan – photography

Charts

Weekly charts

Year-end charts

Certifications

Release history

References

1997 albums
Genesis (band) albums
Atlantic Records albums
Virgin Records albums
Albums produced by Mike Rutherford
Albums produced by Tony Banks (musician)
Albums produced by Nick Davis (record producer)